Dorea formicigenerans  is a Gram-positive, obligately anaerobic, non-spore-forming, and rod-shaped bacterium from the genus Dorea and is found in human faeces.

References

External links 
Type strain of Dorea formicigenerans at BacDive –  the Bacterial Diversity Metadatabase

Lachnospiraceae
Bacteria described in 1974